Angulo (de Angulo, De Angulo) is a surname, and may refer to:
 Gonzalo de Angulo,  Spanish prelate
 Alberto Angulo (born 1970), Spanish basketball player
 Álex Angulo (1953–2014), Spanish actor
 Alfredo Angulo (born 1982), Mexican boxer
 Brayan Angulo (footballer, born 1989) (born 1989), Colombian footballer
 Carlos Angulo (born 1980), Colombian footballer
 Carlos José Iturgaiz Angulo (born 1965), Spanish politician
 Diego Angulo Íñiguez (1901–1986), Spanish art historian
 Gilbert de Angulo (1195–1213), Anglo-Irish knight
 Guillermo Billinghurst Angulo (1851–1915), Peruvian politician
 Jacinto Angulo Pardo, Cuban politician
 Jaime de Angulo (1887–1950), Spanish linguist, novelist, and ethnomusicologist
 James Angulo (born 1974), Colombian retired footballer
 Jocelyn de Angulo, Anglo-Norman knight
 Juan Camilo Angulo (born 1988), Colombian footballer
 Julio Angulo (born 1990), Ecuadorian footballer
 Lucio Angulo (born 1973), Spanish basketball player
 Luis Fernando De Angulo (born 1952), Colombian board director
 Marvin Angulo (born 1986), Costa Rican footballer
 Miguel Ángel Angulo (born 1977), Spanish footballer
 Miles de Angulo (1245–1259), Anglo-Irish knight and baron
 Pedro Angulo (died 1561), Spanish Dominican missionary
 Richard Angulo (born 1980), American football tight end
 Teresa Pizarro de Angulo (1930–2000), Colombian beauty pageant director and farmer
 Vinicio Angulo (born 1988), Ecuadorian footballer
 Yolanda Barcina Angulo (born 1960), Spanish politician
 Angulo brothers, subject of the documentary film The Wolfpack

See also
Ângulo, Paraná, Brazil

Spanish-language surnames